Heßles is a former municipality in the district Schmalkalden-Meiningen, in Thuringia, Germany. Since 1 December 2008, it is part of Fambach.

Geography of Thuringia